The 1944 Romanian coup d'état, better known in Romanian historiography as the Act of 23 August, was a coup d'état led by King Michael I of Romania during World War II on 23 August 1944. With the support of several political parties, the king removed the government of Ion Antonescu, which had aligned Romania with Nazi Germany, after the Axis front in northeastern Romania collapsed in the face of a successful Soviet offensive. The Romanian Army declared a unilateral ceasefire with the Soviet Red Army on the Moldavian front, an event viewed as decisive in the Allied advances against the Axis powers in the European theatre of World War II. The coup was supported by the Romanian Communist Party, the Social Democratic Party, the National Liberal Party, and the National Peasants' Party who had coalesced into the National Democratic Bloc in June 1944.

Preparations
According to Silviu Brucan, the two main conspirators from the Communist Party's side were Emil Bodnăraș and Lucrețiu Pătrășcanu, who contacted King Michael to prepare a coup d'état against Ion Antonescu. The first meeting between King Michael's representatives with the Communists was during the night of 13–14 June 1944 in a secret house of the communists, at 103 Calea Moșilor. Apart from the two communist conspirators, participants in the meeting were Gen. Gheorghe Mihail, Gen. Constantin Sănătescu and Col. Dumitru Dămăceanu, while King Michael was represented by Baron  (marshal of the palace), Mircea Ionnițiu (private secretary) and Grigore Niculescu-Buzești (diplomatic adviser).

The King's representatives presented the Gigurtu plan, through which the King would meet Baron Manfred Freiherr von Killinger, the German ambassador in Bucharest, to discuss the replacement of Antonescu with a cabinet led by Ion Gigurtu. The Communist Party thought that this plan was "naïve and dangerous", as it would have alerted the Gestapo and that it would have meant even more German espionage.

The Communist Party presented an alternative plan, through which King Michael, who was the commander-in-chief, would order the weapons to be turned against Nazi Germany and Antonescu would be summoned to the palace, ordered to sign an armistice with the Allies and, if he refused, be arrested on the spot. After this, a coalition government of the National Democratic Bloc (the National Peasants' Party, the National Liberal Party, the Social Democratic Party and the Romanian Communist Party) would take power.

This proposal was accepted by both the military representatives and the King's advisers, who then convinced King Michael that it was the best solution.

The coup

On August 23, 1944, the king joined with pro-Allied opposition politicians and led a successful coup with support from the army. The king, who was initially considered to be not much more than a "figurehead", was able to successfully depose Antonescu. The king offered a non-confrontational retreat to Killinger, but the Germans considered the coup "reversible" and tried to turn the situation around by military attacks.

On August 23, 1944, the King met with Prime Minister Ion Antonescu, Foreign Affairs Minister Mihai Antonescu (no relation) and General Constantin Sănătescu. During discussions that lasted an hour, Ion Antonescu informed the King of the situation at the frontlines. King Michael asked Antonescu to get out of the war and sign an armistice with the Allies and the Soviets. Antonescu retorted that the armistice would be nullified by Germany and refused to commit to an armistice, especially with the Soviet Union. The King said "If things are so, then there's nothing we can do."

This triggered the coup. A colonel and four soldiers came in and arrested the Prime Minister. Later that night, at 10 pm, the King announced over the radio that Antonescu had been deposed and an armistice with the Allied Powers and the Soviet Union would be accepted. 

The Romanian forces — namely the First Army, the Second Army (under formation), the remnants of the Third Army and the Fourth Army (one corps) — were under orders from the king to defend Romania against any German attacks. The king then offered to put Romania's battered armies on the side of the Allies.

Aftermath

The coup sped the Red Army's advance into Romania. Romanian historians claimed that the coup shortened the war by as much as "six months."

Formal Allied recognition of the de facto change of orientation of Romania in the war came on 12 September 1944. Until this date, Soviet troops started moving into Romania, taking approximately 140,000 Romanian prisoners of war.  About 130,000 Romanian POWs were transported to the Soviet Union, where many perished in prison camps.

The armistice was signed on the same date, 12 September 1944, on Allied terms. Article 18 of the Armistice Agreement with Rumania stipulated that "An Allied Control Commission will be established which will undertake until the conclusion of peace the regulation of and control over the execution of the present terms under the general direction and orders of the Allied (Soviet) High Command, acting on behalf of the Allied Powers." The Annex to Article 18, specified that "The Romanian Government and their organs shall fulfill all instructions of the Allied Control Commission arising out of the Armistice Agreement." It also made clear that the Allied Control Commission would have its seat in Bucharest. In line with Article 14 of the Armistice Agreement, two Romanian People's Tribunals were set up to try suspected war criminals.

In October 1944, Winston Churchill, Prime Minister of the United Kingdom, proposed an agreement with Soviet leader Joseph Stalin on how to divide Eastern Europe into spheres of influence after the war. It was reportedly agreed that Soviet Union would have a "90% share of influence" in Romania.

The Romanian Army, from the armistice until the end of the war, were fighting alongside the Soviets against Germany and its remaining allies. They fought in Transylvania, Hungary and Czechoslovakia. In May 1945 the Romanian First and Fourth Armies took part in the Prague Offensive. The Romanians suffered a total of 169,822 casualties (in all causes) fighting on the Allied side.

Ion Antonescu was placed under arrest; the new Prime Minister, Lt. Gen. Constantin Sănătescu, gave custody of Antonescu to Romanian communists who would turn the former dictator over to the Soviets on 1 September. He was later returned to Romania, where he was tried and executed in 1946.

For his actions, King Michael was decorated with the Soviet Order of Victory by Joseph Stalin in 1945 "for the courageous act of the radical change in Romania's politics towards a break-up from Hitler's Germany and an alliance with the United Nations (the Allied), at the moment when there was no clear sign yet of Germany's defeat." He was also awarded the highest degree (Chief Commander) of the Legion of Merit by  President Harry S. Truman a year later. Nevertheless, he functioned as little more than a figurehead under the new régime. He was finally forced to abdicate and leave the country in 1947, allowing the Communists to set up an communist régime. Michael remained in exile until after the Romanian Revolution of 1989 and was only allowed to return to the country in 1992.

See also
 Armistice of Cassibile
 1944 Bulgarian coup d'état
 Moscow Armistice and Lapland War
 Romania during World War II
 German Military Mission in Romania

Notes

References
 Silviu Brucan, The Wasted Generation: Memoirs of the Romanian Journey from Capitalism to Socialism and Back, Westview Press, 1993 

Rebellions in Romania
Conflicts in 1944
1944 in Romania
Romania in World War II
Romania–Soviet Union relations
Romania
August 1944 events